Gorete Semedo (born 5 October 1996) is a São Tomé and Príncipe track and field athlete competing in sprinting events. In 2017, she competed in the women's 100 metres event at the 2017 World Championships in Athletics held in London, United Kingdom. She did not advance to compete in the semi-finals.

In 2019, she represented São Tomé and Príncipe at the 2019 African Games held in Rabat, Morocco. She competed in both the women's 100 metres and women's 200 metres events. In the 100 metres event she reached the semi-finals where she was disqualified after a false start and in the 200 metres event she did not advance to compete in the semi-finals. In the same year, she also competed in the women's 100 metres event at the 2019 World Athletics Championships held in Doha, Qatar. She did not qualify to compete in the semi-finals.

References

External links 
 

Living people
1996 births
Place of birth missing (living people)
São Tomé and Príncipe female sprinters
World Athletics Championships athletes for São Tomé and Príncipe
African Games competitors for São Tomé and Príncipe
Athletes (track and field) at the 2019 African Games